Transit time may refer to:

Human gastrointestinal transit time in biology
The time for a radar reflection to return
Sun transit time, the time at which the sun passes over the observer's meridian line
The transit time factor for an acceleration voltage, used in accelerator physics
In breath gas analysis, the delay between a gas sample being removed from the patient circuit and the sample being analyzed by a machine
A residence time for flow through a system
Duration of a commute
Duration required for freight transport